Boy de Jong (born 10 April 1994) is a Dutch footballer who plays as a goalkeeper for VV Zwaluwen. He also works for Feyenoord as a goalkeeper coach on the club's academy.

Club career

Early career 
De Jong was born in Voorburg and played in the youth teams of ADO Den Haag, before moving to Feyenoord, where he was a first-choice goalkeeper throughout Feyenoord's youth academy. However, he was unable to find playing time for the first team, with Erwin Mulder and Kostas Lamprou ahead of him in the pecking order. In June 2013, it was announced that De Jong would be loaned to Excelsior for one season in order to gain first-team experience. However, he would only play one friendly match for Excelsior, as manager Jon Dahl Tomasson and his replacement Marinus Dijkhuizen both preferred Jordy Deckers as the starting goalkeeper. In January 2014, De Jong criticised Feyenoord for not supporting him at Excelsior.

PEC Zwolle 
In the summer of 2014, De Jong moved to PEC Zwolle on a free transfer, signing a contract for two seasons. In his first season, he made no appearances as third-choice goalkeeper behind Warner Hahn and Kevin Begois. In the 2015–16 season, Hahn left Zwolle, but De Jong remained third-choice, behind Begois and new signing Mickey van der Hart. Nevertheless, on 19 December 2015, De Jong made his debut in the Eredivisie in an away match against PSV, being substituted on after half an hour due to an injury to Begois. PEC Zwolle manager Ron Jans considered his performance "a fine job." De Jong made one more appearance during the season, starting in the Europa League play-offs away match against FC Utrecht, which they lost 5–2. At the end of the season, his contract was not extended.

Telstar 
On 23 June 2016, De Jong started training with SC Telstar. On 29 July 2016, it was announced that both parties had agreed to a one-season contract. De Jong made his debut for Telstar on 20 September 2016, playing in the KNVB Cup away match against JVC Cuijk (3–1 win). Three days later, he made his Eerste Divisie league debut, replacing the injured Wesley Zonneveld in the fourth minute of the home match against FC Eindhoven (1–4 loss). On 30 September, he started in the away match against FC Den Bosch, keeping the first clean sheet of his senior career as the game ended 0–0. Due to a serious injury sustained by Zonneveld in January 2017, De Jong became the first choice goalkeeper for Telstar for the remainder of the season. He ended his first season with the club with 20 league appearances and 22 in total. At the start of the 2017–18 season, De Jong once again found himself second-choice, as the new head coach Mike Snoei preferred Rody de Boer as the starting goalkeeper.

Anderlecht 
On 24 August 2017, it was announced that De Jong had joined Belgian champions Anderlecht, as a replacement for Davy Roef. According to De Jong, he was signed as third goalkeeper behind Matz Sels and Frank Boeckx. Since his father Max de Jong already worked at Anderlecht as goalkeeper coach, allegations of nepotism were made, but De Jong denied that it was his father who decided on the transfer. On 21 January 2018, during a league away match against Genk, De Jong was on the substitute bench for the first time, replacing the injured Boeckx. For the remainder of the season, he served as back-up goalkeeper due to Boeckx' long-term injury, but did not make an appearance.

On 22 June 2018, De Jong signed a contract extension, keeping him at the club for one more year. During the 2018–19 season, he again did not feature in an official match, being third-choice goalkeeper behind new signing Thomas Didillon and Boeckx. At the end of the season, his contract was not extended, upon which De Jong expressed his fondness of the club and having had the experience of UEFA Champions League and UEFA Europa League matches during his time there.

Stellenbosch 
On 4 July 2019, it was announced De Jong had signed a contract with South African club Stellenbosch F.C., who were newly promoted to the country's highest division. On 3 August 2019, he made his debut for Stellenbosch in the first league match of the season, starting and keeping a clean sheet in the 0–0 draw against Chippa United. On 26 March 2020, it was announced De Jong had terminated his contract with the club to return to the Netherlands, in the light of the COVID-19 pandemic. In total, De Jong played 17 league matches for Stellenbosch.

Later career
In June 2020, De Jong joined Dutch Tweede Divisie club VV Katwijk. In October 2020, he also was also hired as a goalkeeper coach at the academy of his former club, Feyenoord.

In the summer 2021, De Jong then moved to VV Zwaluwen, after the deal was confirmed in March 2021.

International career 

As a Feyenoord youth player, De Jong played in various Netherlands national youth teams. He was the starting goalkeeper of the Netherlands team which was victorious at the 2011 European Under-17 Championship.

Personal life 
On 5 August 2018, De Jong became a father. His partner gave birth to a daughter, named Philou Lovée.

Career statistics 

1 Includes UEFA Champions League and UEFA Europa League matches.

2 Includes Johan Cruyff Shield and Play-off matches.

Honours

Club 
 PEC Zwolle
 Johan Cruyff Shield: 2014

International 
 Netherlands U17
 European Under-17 Championship: 2011

References 

1994 births
Living people
Dutch footballers
Association football goalkeepers
Eredivisie players
Eerste Divisie players
Feyenoord players
Excelsior Rotterdam players
PEC Zwolle players
SC Telstar players
R.S.C. Anderlecht players
Stellenbosch F.C. players
Dutch expatriate footballers
Expatriate footballers in Belgium
Dutch expatriate sportspeople in Belgium
Expatriate soccer players in South Africa
Dutch expatriate sportspeople in South Africa
Netherlands youth international footballers
Sportspeople from Voorburg
Tweede Divisie players
VV Katwijk players
ADO Den Haag players
VSV TONEGIDO players
VV Zwaluwen players
Footballers from South Holland